Periphoba is a genus of moths in the family Saturniidae first described by Jacob Hübner in 1820.

Species
The genus includes the following species:

Periphoba albata (Draudt, 1930)
Periphoba arcaei (Druce, 1886)
Periphoba attali Lemaire & Terral, 1994
Periphoba augur (Bouvier, 1929)
Periphoba aurata Lemaire, 1994
Periphoba campisi  C. Mielke, Ciseski & Naumann, 2020
Periphoba courtini Lemaire, 1994
Periphoba galmeidai Mielke & Furtado, 2006
Periphoba hidalgensis Brechlin & Meister, 2010
Periphoba hircia (Cramer, 1775)
Periphoba moseri Mielke & Furtado, 2006
Periphoba nigra (Dognin, 1901)
Periphoba ockendeni Lemaire, 1995
Periphoba parallela (Schaus, 1921)
Periphoba pascoensis Brechlin & Meister, 2010
Periphoba pessoai Mielke & Furtado, 2006
Periphoba porioni Lemaire, 1982
Periphoba punoensis Brechlin & Meister, 2010
Periphoba rudloffi Brechlin & Meister, 2010
Periphoba tangerini Mielke & Furtado, 2006
Periphoba tarapoto Lemaire, 2002
Periphoba tolimaiana Brechlin & Meister, 2010
Periphoba unicolor (Lemaire, 1977)
Periphoba yungasiana Brechlin & Meister, 2010

References

Hemileucinae